The PDShP is a series of bullpup anti-materiel rifles developed by the Georgian Military Scientific-Technical Center STC Delta. The weapons are based on a bullpup design and there are different versions, Amr mod-1 and Amr mod-2. Development of the current series was completed in 2013.

History
The development of the rifles was complete in late 2012 to early 2013 but the weapons were not revealed earlier than May 2014.

Variants
Currently there are two variants available. They are all bullpup configured. The more recent 12.7×108mm version is recoil-operated with a 6 round box magazine feed and has an effective range of 1800–2000 meters. Its development was completed in 2013.

See also
List of bullpup firearms
List of sniper rifles
KSVK 12.7
OSV-96
OM 50 Nemesis
Barrett M82
Barrett M95
Zastava M93
Zastava M12 Black Spear

References

12.7×108 mm anti-materiel rifles
12.7×108 mm sniper rifles
Bolt-action rifles
Semi-automatic rifles
Military equipment of Georgia (country)
Bullpup firearms
Military equipment introduced in the 2010s